Luis María Ramírez Boettner (March 13, 1918 – July 25, 2017) was a Paraguayan diplomat and lawyer who served as the Minister of Foreign Affairs of Paraguay from December 16, 1993, until May 9, 1996.

Born in 1918, Ramírez received his bachelor's degree in philosophy and letters from the University of Chile in 1934. He then studied law at the Universidad Nacional de Asunción in Paraguay, from which he graduated in 1940 as a lawyer. He earned a master's degree from Harvard Law School in 1942 and a Doctor of Law (J.D.) from the University of Michigan Law School in 1944.

Ramírez joined the Foreign Ministry of Paraguay in 1936. He was appointed as Director of Protocol from 1940 to 1941 and Undersecretary of State for Foreign Affairs from 1954 to 1961. Additionally, he served as the first secretary of the Embassy of Paraguay in the United Kingdom and consul general in London in 1947. He also held the position of minister counselor at the Embassy of Paraguay in Washington, D.C. from 1951 to 1954. 

Ramírez was appointed Ambassador of Paraguay to Brazil from 1991 to 1993. He then served as Paraguay's Minister of Foreign Affairs from December 16, 1993, until May 9, 1996 during the administration of President Juan Carlos Wasmosy. He was next appointed as Paraguay's Ambassador to the Holy See, by Decree No.
13617, from June 7, 1996, until 1999. Ramírez served concurrently as Ambassador to the Sovereign Military Order of Malta beginning on September 12, 1996.

Luis María Ramírez Boettner died on July 25, 2017, at the age of 99.

References

1918 births
2017 deaths
Foreign Ministers of Paraguay
Ambassadors of Paraguay to Brazil
Ambassadors of Paraguay to the Holy See
Paraguayan diplomats
20th-century Paraguayan lawyers
University of Chile alumni
Universidad Nacional de Asunción alumni
Harvard Law School alumni
University of Michigan Law School alumni
Paraguayan people of French descent
Paraguayan people of German descent
Paraguayan people of Spanish descent
Paraguayan expatriates in the United States
People from Asunción
Recipients of the Medal of the Oriental Republic of Uruguay